Pollenia chotei is a species of cluster fly in the family Polleniidae.

Distribution
Thailand.

References

Polleniidae
Insects described in 1979
Diptera of Asia